Quintanilla Vivar (formerly known as Quintanilla Morocisla) is a municipality and town located in the province of Burgos, Castile and León, Spain.

The village of Vivar del Cid, reputed birthplace of El Cid, is included in the municipality.

Demography 
According to the 2009 census (INE), the municipality has a population of 741 inhabitants.

People from Quintanilla Vivar
Ireneo García Alonso (1923-2012) - Bishop of Albacete of the Roman Catholic Church.

References

Municipalities in the Province of Burgos